Op zoek naar Joseph (Looking for Joseph) was a 2008 talent show-themed television series produced by the AVRO in the Netherlands. It searched for a new, unknown lead to play Joseph in a 2009 Dutch revival of the Andrew Lloyd Webber musical Joseph and the Amazing Technicolor Dreamcoat.

The show was hosted by Frits Sissing, who announced Freek Bartels as the winner of the final public telephone vote on 26 October 2008.

It was the second Dutch talent show to be produced by the AVRO/Willem Nijholt, after Op zoek naar Evita. A third talent show, this time called Op zoek naar Mary Poppins aired in 2009, Op zoek naar Zorro aired in late 2010, Op zoek naar Annie aired in 2012, Op zoek naar Maria aired in 2021 and Op zoek naar Danny & Sandy aired in late 2022.

A similar format has been used as well in the United Kingdom in 2007, with the show Any Dream Will Do taking an unknown singer and placing the winner in the lead role for the 2007 performances in the West End. On 9 June 2007, Lee Mead was announced the winner of this show.

It is speculated that a Canadian edition will be produced in the wake of Mirvish Productions' production of the same musical.

Format

Expert panel
An expert panel provided advice to the contestants throughout the series, and provided comments during the live shows. The panel was made up of:
 Pia Douwes, (musical theatre actress who is very successful in Europe)
 Erwin van Lambaarts (managing director of Joop van den Ende theatre)
 Paul de Leeuw (television comedian, actor and singer)
 Willem Nijholt (head judge and actor and singer.)

Live finals
The final eleven contestants competed in the live studio finals held on Sunday nights over eight weeks. Each week the contestants sang and performed during the live show, receiving comments from the judges following their performance. The public then got a chance to vote for their favourite Joseph, and the two contestants with the fewest votes performed a sing-off in front of Nijholt, who then decided which Joseph to keep in the contest. This was repeated with the top ten, the top nine, the top eight, the top seven, the top six, the top five and the top four.

Nijholt had no say in the final casting decision, when in the concluding edition of the series it was left to the public to choose who should play Joseph out of the final two contenders, Freek Bartels and John Vooijs. After more votes were cast, the winning entrant was revealed as Bartels, who won a contract to play Joseph at the Stadsschouwburg in Amsterdam.

Finalists
Eleven potential Josephs made it through the auditions process to perform during the live shows.

* at the start of the contest

Results summary

Live shows
The live shows saw the finalists eliminated one by one following both individual and group performances. Once eliminated, eliminated Joseph then performed "Arme Jozef (Poor, Poor Joseph)\Sluit alle deuren (Close Every Door)" together with the remaining Josephs as his grand exit song, symbolically handing back his dreamcoat.

Week 1 (September 7, 2008)
Following the first week of competition, Robbert was the first Joseph to be eliminated from the competition. The show performances were:

Group performances:
"Go, Go, Go Joseph" (from Joseph and the Amazing Technicolor Dreamcoat)
"Help!" (The Beatles)

Jury's favourite Joseph:
Erwin van Lambaart: Mathijs
Pia Douwes: Mathijs
Paul de Leeuw: Amir
Sing-off:
The bottom two were Roy van Iersel and Robbert van der Bergh. In the sing-off, they had to sing the Carousel song "You'll Never Walk Alone".
Willem Nijholt chose to save Roy and send Robbert home.

Week 2 (September 14, 2008)
Adriaan was the second contestant to be eliminated from the series. The show performances were:

Group performances:
"Livin La Vida Loca" (Ricky Martin)
"Luck Be a Lady" (from Guys and Dolls)

Jury's favourite Joseph:
Erwin van Lambaart: Freek
Pia Douwes: Roy
Paul de Leeuw: Robin
Sing-off:
The bottom two were Hein Gerrits and Adriaan Kroonenberg. In the sing-off, they had to sing the Aida song "Ergens in de sterren (Written in the Stars)".
Willem Nijholt chose to save Hein and send Adriaan home.

Week 3 (September 21, 2008)
In a double elimination, two Josephs were voted off the series. The show performances were:

Group performances:
"Ladies' Choice" (Zac Efron)
"Total Eclipse of the Heart" (Bonnie Tyler)

Jury's favourite Joseph:
Erwin van Lambaart: John
Pia Douwes: Robin
Paul de Leeuw: Freek
Sing-off:
 In the first show, the bottom two were Hein Gerrits and Baer Jonkers. In the sing-off, they had to sing the song "The Impossible Dream" from Man of La Mancha. Nijholt chose to save Baer and send Hein home.
 In the second show, the bottom two were Remko Harms and Robin van den Akker. In the sing-off, they had to sing "Laat Me" by Ramses Shaffy. Robin was saved by Nijholt and Remko was sent home.

Week 4 (September 28, 2008)
Baer became the fourth contestant to hear he was not Joseph. The show performances were:

Group performances:
"Greased Lightning" (from Grease)
"Beat It" (Michael Jackson)

Jury's favourite Joseph:
Erwin van Lambaart: Mathijs
Pia Douwes: Roy
Paul de Leeuw: Roy
Sing-off:
 The bottom two were Baer Jonkers and Robin van den Akker. In the sing-off, they had to sing the Evita song "Hoog vloog je, te hoog (High Flying Adored)".
Willem Nijholt chose to save Robin and send Baer home.

Week 5 (October 5, 2008)
With only six finalists remaining, the Josephs were announced in sets of three and performed in a trio as well as their individual performances. Amir became the fifth contestant to hear he would not be Joseph. The show performances were:

Group performances:
 "Een Voor Allen, Allen Voor Een (All For One, One For All)" (from 3 Musketiers)
Freek, John and Mathijs: "Zomer een dag" (Willeke Alberti)
Roy, Robin and Amir: "Zing, Vecht, Huil, Bid, Lach, Werk En Bewonder" (Ramses Shaffy)
"Moeder, ik wil bij de revue" (Wim Sonneveld)

{| class="wikitable plainrowheaders" style="text-align:center;"
|+ Contestants' performances on the fifth live show
! scope="col" | Contestant
! scope="col" | Order
! scope="col" | Song
! scope="col" | Result
|- style="background:lightblue;"
! scope="row" | John Vooijs
| 1
| "Kon ik nog maar even bij je zijn"
| Bottom 2
|- 
! scope="row" | Freek Bartels
| 2
| "Kom Kees"
| Safe
|-
! scope="row" | Mathijs Pater
| 3
| "Laat me niet alleen (Ne me quitte pas)"
| Safe
|- style = "background:pink"
! scope="row" | Amir Vahidi
| 4
| "Terug naar toen (Journey to the Past)"
| Eliminated
|- 
! scope="row" | Robin van den Akker
| 5
| "Verloren Verleden (Everything That I Am)"
| Safe
|- 
! scope="row" | Roy van Iersel
| 6
| "Waar is de zon?"
| Safe
|}
Jury's favourite Joseph:
Erwin van Lambaart: Mathijs
Pia Douwes: John
Paul de Leeuw: John
Sing-off:
 The bottom two were Amir Vahidi and John Vooijs. In the sing-off, they had to sing "Zij gelooft in mij" by André Hazes.
Willem Nijholt chose to save John and send Amir home.

Week 6 (October 12, 2008)
In the quarter-final, the sixth Joseph to be eliminated was Mathijs. The show performances were:

Group performances:
 "I'm Still Standing" (Elton John)
 "Don't Stop Me Now" (from We Will Rock You)

Jury's favourite Joseph:
Erwin van Lambaart: Freek
Pia Douwes: Freek
Paul de Leeuw: John
Sing-off:
 The bottom two were Robin van den Akker and Mathijs Pater. In the sing-off, they had to sing Nick & Simon's "Pak maar m'n hand".
Willem Nijholt chose to save Robin and send Mathijs home.

Week 7 (October 19, 2008)
In the semi-final, the seventh and final Joseph to be eliminated was Robin. The show performances were:

Group performances:
 "I Just Can't Wait To Be King" (from The Lion King)
 "Elephant Love Medley" (from Moulin Rouge) featuring Brigitte Heitzer

Jury's favourite Joseph:
Erwin van Lambaart: Freek
Pia Douwes: John
Paul de Leeuw: John
Sing-off:
 The bottom two were Robin van den Akker and Roy van Iersel. In the sing-off, they had to sing "Telkens weer" by Willeke Alberti.
Willem Nijholt chose to save Roy and send Robin home.

Week 8 (October 26, 2008)
The grand finale saw Freek win the competition, with John coming second and Roy third. The show performances were:

Group performance:
Finalists and former Josephs: "Kop, Op, Nou Jozef (Go, Go, Go Joseph)\Geef Mij Mijn Dromenjas (Give Me My Coloured Coat)" (from Joseph and the Amazing Technicolor Dreamcoat)
Finalists: "Do You Love Me" (The Contours)
Freek and John: "Mijn Beste Vriend (My Own Best Friend)" (from Chicago)

Jury's verdict on who is Joseph:
Erwin van Lambaart: Freek
Pia Douwes: could not choose between Freek and John
Peter Van de Velde: John
Willem Nijholt: Roy
After being announced as the series winner, Freek concluded the series with a performance of "Laat je droom bestaan (Any Dream Will Do)\Geef Mij Mijn Dromenjas (Give Me My Coloured Coat)".

After the series
Freek Bartels, along with the winner of the previous Nijholt reality show Op zoek naar Evita, Brigitte Heitzer, were the stars of a one-off Christmas Day special to air on AVRO, entitled Kerst met Joseph en Evita (Christmas with Joseph and Evita'').

External links
Official Program Website at avro.nl

Dutch reality television series
Singing talent shows
2000s TV shows in the Netherlands
2008 Dutch television series debuts
2008 Dutch television series endings
NPO 1 original programming